The Chilean national rugby union team (Spanish: Selección de rugby de Chile) represents Chile in men's international rugby union; it is organised by the Chilean Rugby Federation. Nicknamed Los Cóndores (The Condors in English), they play in red and white jerseys. They are currently ranked 21st in the world by World Rugby, making them the third highest-ranked nation in South America.

Chile was the second South American nation after Argentina to play international rugby union, playing their first international test against Argentina in 1936 in Santiago. Chile is one of the founding members of CONSUR (now known as Sudamérica Rugby) in 1989, alongside Argentina, Brazil, Paraguay, and Uruguay. Chile has long been participating in the South American Rugby Championship since 1951 and has consistently been the third or even the second best team in South America. In 2016, Chile, alongside the unions of Argentina, Brazil, Canada, the United States, and Uruguay, formed the Americas Rugby Championship, aimed at increasing the standard of rugby union in the Americas region.

Chile qualified for the 2023 Rugby World Cup, which will be their first appearance in the tournament; they upset Canada in a two-game series in October 2021, before defeating the United States in a two-game home-and-home series on aggregate by 1 point in July 2022. Chile were drawn with England, Japan, Argentina, and Samoa in Pool D of the World Cup.

The sport has historic connections to the Scottish community in the country. In 2012, two Scottish-Chilean players, Donald and Ian Campbell, were inducted into the IRB (now World Rugby) Hall of Fame.

History

Early history (1890s – 1959)
Rugby was introduced in Chile roughly around the late 19th century, as it was in other parts of South America by British immigrants who arrived in ports. The first recorded rugby game taking place on Chilean soil was in 1894, from British immigrants who lived in both Santiago, Iquique and Valparaíso. Until the 1930s, the game was initially mostly played by the British-descended community of Chile. In 1935, the Chilean Rugby Federation was founded.

Chile's first ever fixtures were against Argentina in September 1936, a two-game series played in the capital Santiago. Chile lost both of their games by scorelines of 0 to 20 and 3 to 31, respectively. Chile would visit Argentina in 1938 in Buenos Aires, losing 3 to 33. Chile would not play another fixture until 1948, where they beat Uruguay 21 to 3 in Buenos Aires.

The Chilean team began competing more consistently in the 1950s. In 1951, Chile played the first South American Rugby Championship against Brazil, Uruguay and Argentina in 1951; Chile finished third, beating Brazil by a margin of 68 to nil, but losing to both Uruguay and Argentina. In 1952, Chile received Ireland on tour, but in Santiago 30 to 0. Chile would play another Five Nations side, this time France on tour, but lost 34–3. In 1958, Chile participated in the second South American Rugby Championship, finishing second; Chile easily beat both Peru and Uruguay before falling to Argentina, finishing second.

1960s – 1980s
By the 1960s Chile saw itself established as a middle contender in South America. Chile were consistently beating sides like Brazil and Uruguay, but couldn't breakthrough against the mighty Argentina. In 1966, Chile received the Springboks, their first test against a SANZAR side, but lost 72 to 0. During the 1970s Chile didn't play any non-South American competition; for the most part Chile were finishing second or third in South America, usually beating Brazil and newcomers Paraguay, and dog fighting for second against Uruguay. In the 1980s, former coach of France Jean-Pierre Juanchich took over administration of rugby in Chile, which led to better promotion, awareness, and improvement in Chilean rugby. In 1989, a proper governing body for rugby in South America, CONSUR, was formed.

1990s – 2000s
Chile formally joined the International Rugby Board in 1991, allowing Chile to participate formally in World Cup competitions. In 1993, Chile participated in its first ever World Cup Qualifying competition in 1993, entering qualifying for the 1995 Rugby World Cup; however, they lost all their fixtures to Argentina, Paraguay, and Uruguay, finishing bottom of the group. In 1995, Chile played Spain, winning 28 – 23.

The 1999 Rugby World Cup qualifying campaign was more successful. Chile easily swept through a group containing the teams of Bermuda and Trinidad and Tobago. However, Chile lost 14 to 20 against Uruguay, therefore missing out on a repechage spot, and potentially a spot in the World Cup.

In 2000, Chile came within 2 points of defeating Argentina. This improved form would continue through the early 2000s, easily disposing of Brazil in their first qualifier for the 2003 Rugby World Cup. In the final round, a round robin containing Canada, Uruguay, and the United States, the Chileans won their first home fixture versus Uruguay before losing their next two to the US and Canada. Despite this, Chile recorded an upset, defeating the United States 21 to 13 in Santiago. Despite being improved, Chile dropped their next two games, finishing the campaign with 2 wins and 4 losses. Unfortunately for Chile, they finished bottom on try difference, yet again missing out on a repechage spot, and potential qualification.

Chile then took part at an Intercontinental Cup at home in Santiago in November 2004. Where they recorded arguably one their greatest victories at the time, defeating an up and coming Georgia side 30-24.

The 2007 qualifiers were mostly the same song as the previous campaigns; Chile swept their first round against Paraguay and Brazil but in the final group lost both their games to Argentina and Uruguay, which once again would have secured a repechage at least, and potentially an automatic spot in the World Cup.

The 2011 campaign was short-lived, having automatically been seeded into Round 3A of the qualifiers in the new format. Chile cruised to victory versus Brazil but once again lost to familiar foes Uruguay, and once again missing out on a potential repechage or automatic qualifier.

2010–present
In 2010, Chile nearly started the new decade with a bang, coming very close to defeating Oceania powerhouse Tonga, but losing 32–30. The following year in 2011, Chile beat Uruguay for the first time in nine years, winning 21–18 and finishing second in the South American Championship.

The decade has been marked by inconsistency in results. In 2013, Chile began their qualifying campaign, opening up with a victory versus Brazil, but yet again lost to foes Uruguay, following the same pattern of results since the 1999 campaign. In 2014, Chile reached a bottom point; in the 2014 South American Championship, they finished bottom of the group, losing to Brazil for the first time in their history. Chile were also wooden spooners in the 2014 CONSUR Cup, the new competition featuring Argentina and the top 2 sides in South America. However, the following year, Chile won the South American Championship for the first time in their history, cruising through both Brazil and Paraguay before defeating Uruguay at home 30–15.

In 2016, Chile participated in the first Americas Rugby Championship in its current format. Chile squeaked a home win versus Brazil, before playing a close game against Argentina before tiring out in the last 20 minutes, ultimately losing 52–15. Chile were blown out by the United States in Fort Lauderdale 64–0 before nearly beating Uruguay, losing 20–23. Chile lost their last game at home versus Canada, 64–13, finishing bottom in the inaugural edition.

In the 2017 Americas Rugby Championship, Chile was defeated in all five matches, scoring just four tries in the tournament. In the 2017 Cup of Nations, the team claimed a win over Kenya, while losing to Russia and Hong Kong.

Going into the 2020s Chile finally looked to have turned a corner after having successfully come through the first rounds of South America qualification for the 2023 RWC, they went into the Americas 2 Repechage with strong chances of upsetting a weakened Canada side. In a 2 legged play-off Chile held Canada to a tight 22-21 opener at Langford, British Columbia before overcoming 33-24 in Valparaiso, winning 54-46 on aggregate and booking their place in the Americas 2 qualifier v the USA. It was also their first ever win over Canada at the 9th attempt and one of their biggest scalps yet.

In July 2022 Chile qualified for the Rugby World Cup for the first time. They secured their place with an aggregate 52–51 win over the United States, overturning a one-point deficit in the first leg with a 31–29 win in Glendale, Colorado.

Record

Overall record

Below is a table of the representative rugby matches played by a Chile national XV at test level up until 28 October 2022.

World Cup record

South American Rugby Championship record

 
 1951 - Runners-up
 1958 - Runners-up
 1961 - Runners-up
 1964 - Fourth place
 1967 - Runners-up
 1969 - Runners-up
 1971 - Runners-up
 1973 - Third place
 1975 - Runners-up
 1977 - Third place
 1979 - Runners-up
 1981 - Runners-up
 1983 - Third place
 1985 - Third place
 1987 - Third place
 1989 - Third place
 1991 - Third place
 1993 - Fourth place
 1995 - Third place
 1997 - Third place
 1998 - Third place
 2000 - Third place
 2001 - Third place
 2002 - Third place
 2003 - Third place
 2004 - Third place
 2005 - Third place
 2006 - Third place
 2007 - Third place
 2008 - Third place
 2009 - Third place
 2010 - Third place
 2011 - Runners-up
 2012 - Third place
 2013 - Third place
 2014 - Fourth place
 2015 - First place
 2016 - Runners-up
 2017 - Runners-up
 2018 - Third place
 2019 - Third place
 2020 - Runners-up

Sudamérica Rugby Cup/CONSUR Cup record
 
 2014 - Third place
 2015 - Did not participate
 2016 - Third place
 2017 - Third place

Americas Rugby Championship record
 2016 - Sixth place
 2017 - Sixth place
 2018 - Sixth place
 2019 - Sixth place

Players

Current squad
On 26 October, Chile named a 31-man squad for their 2022 End-of-Year European tour, playing Romania, Tonga and Irish provincial team, Leinster Rugby.

Head Coach:  Pablo Lemoine
 Caps Updated: 5 November 2022

Notable players
 Donald Campbell
 Ian Campbell
 Alastair MacGregor Martin
 Cristian Onetto
 Sergio Valdes
 Francisco Planella

Past coaches
Since the 1999 Rugby World Cup

See also
 Rugby union in Chile
 Chilean Rugby Federation
 Chile national rugby sevens team
 Chile national under-20 rugby union team
 Selknam
 South American Jaguars
 Sport in Chile

External links
 Official website

References

Chile national rugby union team
South American national rugby union teams